The Curimatidae, toothless characins, are a family of freshwater fishes, of the order Characiformes. They originate from southern Costa Rica to northern Argentina. The family has around 105 species, many of them frequently exploited for human consumption. They are closely related to the Prochilodontidae.

This family lacks jaw teeth, although they do sometimes have small teeth on their pharyngeal plates. They eat films of slime coating underwater surfaces, which consist largely of algae, zooplankton and detritus. It has been suggested that feeding behavior of some species like Psectrogaster essequibensis may change its  diet pattern in function of the sediment content of the water, showing a regime mainly based on algae in waters with high sediment load, until an omnivorous  or detritivore regime in waters with low sediment load.

Classification
The family has eight genera and around 105 species:

Family Curimatidae
 Curimata (13 species)
 Curimatella (five species)
 Curimatopsis (nine species)
 Cyphocharax (38 species)
 Potamorhina (five species)
 Psectogaster (eight species)
 Pseudocurimata (six species)
 Steindachnerina (23 species)

See also
List of fish families

References

 Nelson, Joseph S. (2006). Fishes of the World. John Wiley & Sons, Inc. 

 
Fish of South America
Ray-finned fish families